The Men's elimination competition at the 2022 UCI Track Cycling World Championships was be held on 16 October 2022.

Results
The race was started at 16:20.

References

Men's elimination